is a Japanese manga artist. He is best known as the author of the yonkoma manga , which was adapted as a 58-episode anime television series and for which he received the 1988 Shogakukan Manga Award for children's manga. He also later created a manga adaption of Ratchet & Clank.

He began his career as an assistant to Kenshi Hirokane.

References

External links 
 

1955 births
Living people
Manga artists from Hokkaido
People from Hakodate
Rikkyo University alumni